Interaction nets are a graphical model of computation devised by Yves Lafont in 1990 as a generalisation of the proof structures of linear logic. An interaction net system is specified by a set of agent types and a set of interaction rules. Interaction nets are an inherently distributed model of computation in the sense that computations can take place simultaneously in many parts of an interaction net, and no synchronisation is needed. The latter is guaranteed by the strong confluence property of reduction in this model of computation. Thus interaction nets provide a natural language for massive parallelism. Interaction nets are at the heart of many implementations of the lambda calculus, such as efficient closed reduction and optimal, in Lévy's sense, Lambdascope.

Definitions 

Interactions nets are graph-like structures consisting of agents and edges.

An agent of type  and with arity  has one principal port and  auxiliary ports. Any port can be connected to at most one edge. Ports that are not connected to any edge are called free ports. Free ports together form the interface of an interaction net. All agent types belong to a set  called signature.

A tree  with its root  is inductively defined either as an edge , or as an agent  with its free principal port  and its auxiliary ports  connected to the roots of other trees .

Graphically, the primitive structures of interaction nets can be represented as follows:

When two agents are connected to each other with their principal ports, they form an active pair. For
active pairs one can introduce interaction rules which describe how the active pair rewrites to another interaction
net. An interaction net with no active pairs is said to be in normal form. A signature  (with  defined on it) along with a set of interaction rules defined for agents  together constitute an interaction system.

Interaction calculus 

Textual representation of interaction nets is called the interaction calculus and can be seen as a programming language.

Inductively defined trees correspond to terms  in the interaction calculus, where  is called a name.

Any interaction net  can be redrawn using the previously defined wiring and tree primitives as follows:

which in the interaction calculus corresponds to a configuration

,

The ordered sequence  in the left-hand side is called an interface, while the right-hand side contains an unordered multiset of equations . Wiring  translates to names, and each name has to occur exactly twice in a configuration.

Just like in the -calculus, the interaction calculus has the notions of -conversion and substitution naturally defined on configurations. Specifically, both occurrences of any name can be replaced with a
new name if the latter does not occur in a given configuration. Configurations are considered equivalent up to -conversion. In turn, substitution  is the result of replacing the name  in a term  with another term  if  has exactly one occurrence in the term .

Any interaction rule can be graphically represented as follows:
 

where , and the interaction net  on the right-hand side is redrawn using the wiring and tree primitives in order to translate into the interaction calculus as  using Lafont's notation.

The interaction calculus defines reduction on configurations in more details than seen from graph
rewriting defined on interaction nets. Namely, if , the following reduction:

is called interaction.
in substitution of the other occurrence of the name  in some term :

or
.

An equation  is called a deadlock if  has occurrence in term . Generally only deadlock-free interaction nets are considered. Together, interaction and indirection define the reduction relation on configurations.

Properties 

Interaction nets benefit from the following properties:

 locality (only active pairs can be rewritten);
 linearity (each interaction rule can be applied in constant time);

These properties together allow massive parallelism.

Interaction combinators 

One of the simplest interaction systems that can simulate any other interaction system is that of interaction combinators. Interaction rules for these agents are:

  called erasing;
  called duplication;
  and  called annihilation.

Graphically, the erasing and duplication rules can be represented as follows:

with an example of a non-terminating interaction net that reduces to itself. Its infinite reduction sequence starting from the corresponding configuration in the interaction calculus is as follows:

Non-deterministic extension 

Interaction nets are essentially deterministic and cannot model non-deterministic computations directly. In order to express non-deterministic choice, interaction nets need to be extended. In fact, it is sufficient to introduce just one agent  with two principal ports and the following interaction rules:

This distinguished agent represents ambiguous choice and can be used to simulate any other agent with arbitrary number of principal ports. For instance, it allows to define a  boolean operation that returns true if any of its arguments is true, independently of the computation taking place in the other arguments.

See also 

 Geometry of interaction
 Graph rewriting
 Lambda calculus
 Linear graph grammar
 Linear logic
 Proof net

References

Further reading

External links 

 
 
 
 
 
 

Models of computation